Millen Baars (born 30 May 2000) is a Dutch footballer who currently plays as a forward for Jong AZ.

International career
Born in the Netherlands, Baars is of Surinamese descent. He is a youth international for the Netherlands.

Career statistics

Club

Notes

References

2000 births
Living people
Dutch footballers
Netherlands youth international footballers
Dutch sportspeople of Surinamese descent
Dutch expatriate footballers
Association football forwards
AFC Ajax players
Manchester United F.C. players
AZ Alkmaar players
Jong AZ players
Eerste Divisie players
Dutch expatriate sportspeople in England
Expatriate footballers in England